The World Powerlifting Congress (WPC) is a powerlifting federation hosting meets around the world. The federation hosts competitions which allow multi-ply equipment, but hosted a Raw world championship for the first time in 2009.

The WPC was established in 1986 and has affiliates in 46 countries.

In 1999, the WPC started to host drug tested competitions under the AWPC (Amateur World Powerlifting Congress) banner, with both raw and equipped contests. The competitive season comes to an end each year in November, as qualified lifters from different countries compete in the annual WPC World Championships.

The United States affiliate for the WPC is the American Powerlifting Federation (APF). The APF has several series of qualifying competitions that allow athletes to advance from the local/state level, to the national level, and then finally to the international level, the WPC/AWPC.
  
As of 2013, the British affiliate is known as the BPU (British Powerlifting Union), following the BPC (British Powerlifting Committee) losing the WPC license.

WPC World Championships

Men  
WPC world champions

WPC Raw World Championships
The WPC began hosting the WPC Raw World Championships (without the use of single/multi-ply gear) in 2009. The only equipment allowed is a weight belt and wrist wraps.

Men

AWPC Raw World Championships
The WPC began hosting the drug tested AWPC Raw World Championships (without the use of single/multi-ply gear) in 2009. The only equipment allowed is a weight belt and wrist wraps. Unlike the WPC, the event is drug tested.

Men

AWPC Classic Raw World Championships 
The WPC began hosting the drug tested AWPC Classic Raw World Championships (without the use of single/multi-ply gear) wherein the only equipment allowed is a weight belt, knee wraps/knee sleeves and wrist wraps. Unlike the WPC, the event is drug tested.

Men

Women

References

External links
World Powerlifting Congress website

Powerlifting
International sports organizations